Captain Edward Stephen Fogarty Fegen,  (8 October 1891 – 5 November 1940) was a Royal Navy officer and a recipient of the Victoria Cross, the highest award for gallantry in the face of the enemy that can be awarded to British and Commonwealth forces.

Edward Stephen Fogarty Fegen was born into a naval family, one of four children his father being Vice-Admiral F. F. Fegen MVO. He was born at 42 Nightingale Rd, Southsea, Hampshire, on 8 October 1891. At the age of 12, he entered Osborne Royal Naval College and in 1909, he was appointed Midshipman on HMS Dreadnought.

First World War
On 24 March 1918, while the British ship SS War Knight was proceeding up the English Channel in convoy, she collided with the United States oil carrier O.B. Jennings. It appears that the naphtha, which was on board the latter vessel, ignited, and the two ships and surrounding water were soon enveloped in flames. The master of O.B. Jennings gave orders that all the ship's available boats should be lowered, those on the starboard side were burnt, and the crew abandoned the ship in the port boats, whilst the master, chief engineer, chief officer and three others remained on board. , under the command of Lieutenant Fegen, with other destroyers, were proceeding to the spot to render assistance, when it was seen that one boat which had been lowered from O.B. Jennings had been swamped. Garland closed with O.B. Jennings, rescued the men from the swamped boat, and then proceeded alongside the ship, which was still blazing, and rescued those who were still on board. She afterwards proceeded to pick up the others who had left the ship in boats, rescuing in all four officers and twenty-two men. Lieutenant Fegen handled his ship in a very able manner under difficult conditions during the rescue of the survivors, while Quartermaster Driscoll worked the helm and saw that all orders to the engine-room were correctly carried out, and his actions during this rescue resulted in both being awarded Silver Sea Gallantry Medals.

Interwar service
A little later in his naval career, Fegen was seconded to the Royal Australian Navy, and during 1928–29, served as executive officer in the Royal Australian Naval College, which was located on Jervis Bay on the south coast of New South Wales. By coincidence, the vessel on which he later achieved fame (and death) was named after this bay.

Second World War
He was 49 years old, and an acting captain in the Royal Navy during the Second World War when the following deed took place for which he was awarded the VC.

On 5 November 1940 in the Atlantic, Captain Fegen, commanding the armed merchantman , was escorting 38 ships of Convoy HX 84, when they were attacked by the German heavy cruiser  (often termed a "pocket battleship"). Captain Fegen immediately engaged the enemy head-on, thus giving the ships of the convoy time to scatter. Out-gunned and on fire Jervis Bay maintained the unequal fight for 22 minutes, although the captain's right arm was shattered, and even after he died when the bridge was shot from under him. He went down with his ship but 31 ships of the convoy managed to escape – including .

He was remembered in Winston Churchill's broadcast speech on 13 May 1945 "Five years of War", as having defended Ireland's honour:

The citation for Fegen's Victoria Cross was published in the London Gazette on 22 November 1940, reading:

In popular culture
Issue #47 of the comic book Hitman by Garth Ennis and John McCrea contains a fictionalized account of Fegen's last battle and the sinking of the Jervis Bay.

References

Connel, G.G., (1987) Mediterranean Maelstrom: H. M. S. "Jervis" and the 14th Flotilla, William Kimber, London 
Edwards, Bernard, (2013) Convoy Will Scatter: The Full Story of Jervis Bay and Convoy HX84, Pen and Sword, 
Pollock, George, (1958) The Jervis Bay, William Kimber, London

External links
Commander E.S Fogarty Fegen in The Art of War exhibition at the UK National Archives
Captain Fegan and HMS "Jervis Bay"¨
Royal Naval Museum Biography
World War II Unit Histories & Officers – RN Officers
HMS Jervis Bay

1891 births
1940 deaths
People from Southsea
British World War II recipients of the Victoria Cross
Royal Navy officers of World War I
Irish World War II recipients of the Victoria Cross
Recipients of the Sea Gallantry Medal
Royal Navy officers of World War II
Royal Navy personnel killed in World War II
People lost at sea
Royal Navy recipients of the Victoria Cross
English people of Irish descent
Captains who went down with the ship
Military personnel from Portsmouth